The Four Seasons is a group of four violin concertos by Italian composer Antonio Vivaldi, each of which gives musical expression to a season of the year. These were composed around 1718−1720, when Vivaldi was the court chapel master in Mantua.

The Four Seasons is the best known of Vivaldi's works. Though three of the concerti are wholly original, the first, "Spring", borrows patterns from a sinfonia in the first act of Vivaldi's contemporaneous opera Il Giustino. The inspiration for the concertos is not the countryside around Mantua, as initially supposed, where Vivaldi was living at the time, since according to Karl Heller they could have been written as early as 1716–1717, while Vivaldi was engaged with the court of Mantua only in 1718.

They were a revolution in musical conception: in them Vivaldi represented flowing creeks, singing birds (of different species, each specifically characterized), a shepherd and his barking dog, buzzing flies, storms, drunken dancers, hunting parties from both the hunters' and the prey's point of view, frozen landscapes, and warm winter fires.

Unusually for the period, Vivaldi published the concerti with accompanying sonnets (possibly written by the composer himself) that elucidated what it was in the spirit of each season that his music was intended to evoke. The concerti therefore stand as one of the earliest and most detailed examples of what would come to be called program music—in other words, music with a narrative element. Vivaldi took great pains to relate his music to the texts of the poems, translating the poetic lines themselves directly into the music on the page. For example, in the middle section of "Spring", when the goatherd sleeps, his barking dog can be heard in the viola section. The music is elsewhere similarly evocative of other natural sounds. Vivaldi divided each concerto into three movements (fast–slow–fast), and, likewise, each linked sonnet into three sections.

Structure

Vivaldi's arrangement is as follows:

 Concerto No. 1 in E major, Op. 8, RV 269, "Spring" (La primavera)
Concerto No. 2 in G minor, Op. 8, RV 315, "Summer" (L'estate)
 Concerto No. 3 in F major, Op. 8, RV 293, "Autumn" (L'autunno)
 Concerto No. 4 in F minor, Op. 8, RV 297, "Winter" (L'inverno)

A performance of all four concerti may take about 40–43 minutes. Approximate timings of the individual concerti:
 Spring: 10 minutes
 Summer: 11 minutes
 Autumn: 11 minutes
 Winter: 9 minutes

Sonnets and allusions

There is some debate as to whether the four concertos were written to accompany four sonnets or vice versa. Though it is not known who wrote the accompanying sonnets, the theory that Vivaldi wrote them is supported by the fact that each sonnet is broken into three sections, each neatly corresponding to a movement in the concerto. Regardless of the sonnets' authorship, The Four Seasons can be classified as program music, instrumental music intended to evoke something extra-musical, and an art form which Vivaldi was determined to prove sophisticated enough to be taken seriously.

In addition to these sonnets, Vivaldi provided instructions such as "The barking dog" (in the second movement of "Spring"), "Languor caused by the heat" (in the first movement of "Summer"), and "the drunkards have fallen asleep" (in the second movement of "Autumn").

A new translation of the sonnets into English by Armand D'Angour was published in 2019.

Sonnet text
{| class="wikitable"
!Sonnet
!Italian
!English
|-
|Spring
|<poem>Allegro
Giunt' è la Primavera e festosetti
La Salutan gl' Augei con lieto canto,
E i fonti allo Spirar de' Zeffiretti
Con dolce mormorio Scorrono intanto:
Vengon' coprendo l' aer di nero amanto
E Lampi, e tuoni ad annuntiarla eletti
Indi tacendo questi, gl' Augelletti;
Tornan' di nuovo al lor canoro incanto:

Largo
E quindi sul fiorito ameno prato
Al caro mormorio di fronde e piante
Dorme 'l Caprar col fido can' à lato.

Allegro mandolin concerto
Di pastoral Zampogna al suon festante
Danzan Ninfe e Pastor nel tetto amato
Di primavera all' apparir brillante.</poem>
|Allegro
Springtime is upon us. 
The birds celebrate her return with festive song,
and murmuring streams are
softly caressed by the breezes.
Thunderstorms, those heralds of Spring, roar,
casting their dark mantle over heaven,
Then they die away to silence,
and the birds take up their charming songs once more.

Largo
On the flower-strewn meadow, with leafy branches
rustling overhead, the goat-herd sleeps,
his faithful dog beside him.

Allegro
Led by the festive sound of rustic bagpipes,
nymphs and shepherds lightly dance
beneath spring’s beautiful canopy.
|-
|Summer
|Allegro non molto
Sotto dura Staggion dal Sole accesa
Langue l' huom, langue 'l gregge, ed arde il Pino;
Scioglie il Cucco la Voce, e tosto intesa
Canta la Tortorella e 'l gardelino.
Zeffiro dolce Spira, mà contesa
Muove Borea improviso al Suo vicino;
E piange il Pastorel, perche sospesa
Teme fiera borasca, e 'l suo destino;

Adagio e piano – Presto e forte
Toglie alle membra lasse il Suo riposo
Il timore de' Lampi, e tuoni fieri
E de mosche, e mosconi il Stuol furioso!

Presto
Ah, che pur troppo i Suo timor Son veri
Tuona e fulmina il Ciel e grandinoso
Tronca il capo alle Spiche e a' grani alteri.
|Allegro non molto
Under a hard season, fired up by the sun
Languishes man, languishes the flock and burns the pine
We hear the cuckoo's voice;
then sweet songs of the turtledove and finch are heard.
Soft breezes stir the air, but threatening
the North Wind sweeps them suddenly aside.
The shepherd trembles,
fearing violent storms and his fate.

Adagio e piano – Presto e forte
The fear of lightning and fierce thunder
Robs his tired limbs of rest
As gnats and flies buzz furiously around.

Presto
Alas, his fears were justified
The Heavens thunder and roar and with hail
Cut the head off the wheat and damages the grain.
|-
|Autumn
|Allegro
Celebra il Vilanel con balli e Canti
Del felice raccolto il bel piacere
E del liquor de Bacco accesi tanti
Finiscono col Sonno il lor godere.

Adagio molto
Fà ch' ogn' uno tralasci e balli e canti
L' aria che temperata dà piacere,
E la Staggion ch' invita tanti e tanti
D' un dolcissimo Sonno al bel godere.

Allegro
cacciator alla nov' alba à caccia
Con corni, Schioppi, e cani escono fuore
Fugge la belva, e Seguono la traccia;
Già Sbigottita, e lassa al gran rumore
De' Schioppi e cani, ferita minaccia
Languida di fuggir, mà oppressa muore.
|Allegro
Celebrates the peasant, with songs and dances,
The pleasure of a bountiful harvest.
And fired up by Bacchus' liquor,
many end their revelry in sleep.

Adagio molto
Everyone is made to forget their cares and to sing and dance
By the air which is tempered with pleasure
And (by) the season that invites so many, many
Out of their sweetest slumber to fine enjoyment

Allegro
The hunters emerge at the new dawn,
And with horns and dogs and guns depart upon their hunting
The beast flees and they follow its trail;
Terrified and tired of the great noise
Of guns and dogs, the beast, wounded, threatens
Languidly to flee, but harried, dies.
|-
|Winter
|Allegro non molto
Agghiacciato tremar trà nevi algenti
Al Severo Spirar d' orrido Vento,
Correr battendo i piedi ogni momento;
E pel Soverchio gel batter i denti;

Largo
Passar al foco i di quieti e contenti
Mentre la pioggia fuor bagna ben cento

Allegro
Caminar Sopra il giaccio, e à passo lento
Per timor di cader girsene intenti;
Gir forte Sdruzziolar, cader à terra
Di nuove ir Sopra 'l giaccio e correr forte
Sin ch' il giaccio si rompe, e si disserra;
Sentir uscir dalle ferrate porte
Sirocco, Borea, e tutti i Venti in guerra
Quest' é 'l verno, mà tal, che gioja apporte.
|Allegro non molto
To tremble from cold in the icy snow,
In the harsh breath of a horrid wind;
To run, stamping one's feet every moment,
Our teeth chattering in the extreme cold

Largo
Before the fire to pass peaceful,
Contented days while the rain outside pours down.

Allegro
We tread the icy path slowly and cautiously,
for fear of tripping and falling.
Then turn abruptly, slip, crash on the ground and,
rising, hasten on across the ice lest it cracks up.
We feel the chill north winds course through the home
despite the locked and bolted doors...
this is winter, which nonetheless
brings its own delights. 
|}

Recording history

The date and personnel on the first recording of The Four Seasons are disputed. There is a compact disc of a recording made by the violinist Alfredo Campoli taken from acetates of a French radio broadcast; these are thought to date from early in 1939. The first proper electrical recording was made in 1942 by Bernardino Molinari; though his is a somewhat different interpretation from modern performances, it is clearly recognisable as The Four Seasons. Molinari's recording was made for Cetra, and was issued in Italy and subsequently in the United States on six double-sided 78s, in the 1940s. It was then reissued on long-playing album in 1950, and, later, on compact disc.

The first American recording was made in the final week of 1947 by the violinist Louis Kaufman. The recording was made at Carnegie Hall in advance of a scheduled recording ban effective 1 January 1948. The performers were The Concert Hall Chamber Orchestra under Henry Swoboda, Edith Weiss-Mann (harpsichord) and Edouard Nies-Berger (organ). This recording helped the re-popularisation of Vivaldi's music in the mainstream repertoire of Europe and America following on the work done by Molinari and others in Italy. It won the French Grand Prix du Disque in 1950, was elected to the Grammy Hall of Fame in 2002, and was selected the following year for the National Recording Registry in the Library of Congress. Kaufman, intrigued to learn that the four concertos were in fact part of a set of twelve, set about finding a full score and eventually recorded the other eight concertos in Zürich in 1950, making his the first recording of Vivaldi's complete Op. 8.

The ensemble I Musici recorded The Four Seasons several times, the debut recording in 1955 with Felix Ayo; a 1959 recording featuring Ayo again; and subsequent recordings featuring Roberto Michelucci (1969), Pina Carmirelli (1982), Federico Agostini (1990), and Mariana Sîrbu (1995). There is also a video recording of The Four Seasons performed by I Musici in Antonio Vivaldi's hometown of Venice, filmed by Anton van Munster in 1988. The 1969 Argo recording by the Academy of St. Martin-in-the-Fields conducted by Neville Marriner and featuring the soloist Alan Loveday sold over half a million copies; it became the ensemble's first gold record.

I Solisti di Zagreb, under the baton of Antonio Janigro with Jan Tomasow as violin soloist and Anton Heiller on harpsichord, followed in 1957 on the Vanguard label, further reissued under the Philips and other labels. Wilfrid Mellers, an English music critic, musicologist and composer wrote of this performance, "the soloists phrase their lyricism beautifully." John Thornton wrote about this recording, "Here is matchless ensemble playing, topped by Tomasow's secure playing. Janigro reveals his talent for conducting, which competes with his considerable talent for cello playing."

Ivan Supek wrote of this recording:

Paul Shoemaker wrote about this recording:

Nigel Kennedy's 1989 recording of The Four Seasons with the English Chamber Orchestra sold over  copies, becoming one of the best-selling classical works ever. Gil Shaham and the Orpheus Chamber Orchestra recorded The Four Seasons as well as a music video for the first movement of "Winter" that was featured regularly on The Weather Channel in the mid-1990s.

Surround sound versions of the piece have been issued on Super Audio CD by Richard Tognetti, Pinchas Zukerman, Jonathan Carney and Rachel Podger.The World's Encyclopedia of Recorded Music in 1952 cites only two recordings of The Four Seasons – by Molinari and Kaufman. , approximately 1,000 recorded versions have been made since Campoli's in 1939.

Classical musicians have sought to distinguish their recordings of The Four Seasons, with historically informed performances, and embellishments, to the point of varying the instruments and tempi, or playing notes differently from the listener's expectation (whether specified by the composer or not). It is said that Vivaldi's work presents such opportunities for improvisation.

Reception
The Four Seasons was voted #67 in the Classic FM Hall of Fame. Three of the four concerti were included in the Classic 100 Concerto listing.

Derivative works
Derivative works of these concerti include arrangements, transcriptions, covers, remixes, samples, and parodies in music — themes in theater and opera, soundtracks in films (or video games), and choreography in ballet (along with contemporary dance, figure skating, rhythmic gymnastics, synchronized swimming, etc.) — either in their entirety, single movements, or medleys. Antonio Vivaldi appears to have started this trend of adapting music from The Four Seasons, and since then it has expanded into many aspects of the performing arts (as have other instrumental & vocal works by the composer). This contest between harmony and invention (as it were) now involves various genres around the world:

1726 (or 1734)
 Vivaldi re-scored the Allegro movement from the "Spring" concerto, both as the opening sinfonia (third movement), and chorus (adding lyrics) for his opera Dorilla in Tempe.
 J. S. Bach used the theme of the first movement of the "Spring" concerto for the third movement (aria) of his cantata Wer weiß, wie nahe mir mein Ende? (BWV 27).

1727 (or 1730, 1731)
 Vivaldi based his setting of "Gelido in ogni vena", an aria from Metastasio's Siroe, re di Persia libretto, on the first movement of the "Winter" concerto. Vivaldi's Siroe, containing an aria on this text, premiered in 1727 (music lost). An aria on the "Gelido in ogni vena" text also appeared in his 1730 Argippo (music lost). In 1731, he inserted the extant version of this aria in his Farnace when this opera was restaged in Pavia.

1739
 Nicolas Chédeville (France) arranged the concerti (as "Le printemps, ou Les saisons amusantes") for hurdy-gurdy or musette, violin, flute, and continuo.

1765
 The French composer Michel Corrette composed and published a choral motet, Laudate Dominum de Coelis, subtitled Motet à Grand Chœur arrangé dans le Concerto de Printemps de Vivaldi. The work, for choir and orchestra, consists of the words of Psalm 148 set to the music from the Spring concerto with vocal soloists singing the solo concerto parts.

1775
 Jean-Jacques Rousseau published his flute version of the "Spring" concerto.Le Printemps de Vivaldi  at 

1969
 The Swingle Singers (France) recorded an album (The Joy of Singing) based on the work (and that of other composers).

1970
 Astor Piazzolla (Argentina) published Estaciones Porteñas, "The Four Seasons of Buenos Aires"; these have been included in "eight seasons" performances, along with Vivaldi's work, by various artists.

1972
 Moe Koffman (Canada) recorded a jazz album of the concerti.

1976
 The New Koto Ensemble (Japan) recorded the concerti on koto instruments.

1978
 Michael Franks (United States) composed a vocal serenade based on the theme of the Adagio from the "Summer" concerto. This was subsequently covered by WoongSan (Korea) in 2010.

1981
 The Four Seasons is used in the eponymous 1981 film, along with other Vivaldi concertos for flute.

1982
 Patrick Gleeson (United States) recorded a "computer realization" of the concerti.

1984
 Thomas Wilbrandt (West Germany) composed and recorded "The Electric V" (later adapted for film), which interprets Vivaldi's work with ambient electronics, vocals, and samples of the original concerti.
 Roland Petit (France) choreographed a ballet (entitled "Les Quatre Saisons") to an I Musici performance of Vivaldi's work.

1987
 Ben Shedd (United States) produced a scenic tour of nature with the concerti as background music (narrated by William Shatner).

1990
 A MIDI arrangement of the "Spring" concerto by Passport Designs was included with Windows 3.0.

1993
 Jean-Pierre Rampal (France) recorded arrangements of the concerti for flute; these were also recorded by Jadwiga Kotnowska.

1995
 Arnie Roth (United States) recorded "The Four Seasons Suite", including sonnets (recited by Patrick Stewart). This may not qualify as a derivative work, depending on whether Vivaldi's translated sonnets were meant to be narrated with the music (versus being read in Italian, or silently by the audience).

1997
 The Baronics (Canada) recorded surf guitar versions of one movement from each of the concerti.
 French musician Jacques Loussier composed and recorded, with his trio, jazz-swing interpretations of the concerti.

1998
 The Great Kat (England/United States) recorded a shred guitar (and violin) version of the Presto movement from the "Summer" concerto.
 Vanessa-Mae (Singapore/Britain) recorded a crossover version of the same movement for electric violin.

1999
 The Chinese Baroque Players recorded arrangements of the concerti for traditional Chinese instruments.
 Petrova & Tikhonov (Russia) performed their long program to a medley of Vivaldi's seasons to win the European Figure Skating Championships.

2000
 Venice Harp Quartet (Italy) recorded arrangements of the concerti for harp ensemble.
 Gustavo Montesano (Argentina) recorded a tango guitar version of the "Spring" Allegro with the Royal Philharmonic Orchestra.
 Jochen Brusch (Germany) & Sven-Ingvart Mikkelsen (Denmark) recorded arrangements of the concerti for violin and organ.

2001
 
 Ferhan & Ferzan Önder (Turkish twin sisters) recorded a transcription of the concerti for two pianos by Antun Tomislav Šaban.
 BanYa (South Korea) recorded a dance version of the "Winter" concerto for the Pump It Up video game.
 Susan Osborn (United States) recorded a new-age vocal serenade based on the "Winter" Largo.
 The Charades (Finland) recorded the Presto from the "Summer" concerto as "Summer Twist", for surf guitar ensemble.
 

2003
 Red Priest (UK) recorded arrangements of the concerti for recorder.
 Hayley Westenra (New Zealand) adapted the "Winter" concerto into a song titled "River of Dreams" which is sung in English. It was recorded for her Pure album on July 10.

2004
 Tafelmusik (Canada) arranged a cross-cultural arts special based on the concerti, involving a Chinese pipa, Indian sarangi and Inuit throat-singing.

2005
 Mỹ Linh (Vietnamese singer) adapted the "Winter" concerto into a song titled "Mùa Đông" (which means "winter" also) on her album Chat với Mozart (Chat with Mozart).
 Dark Moor (Spain) recorded an electric-guitar version of the Allegro non molto movement from the "Winter" concerto; this was later integrated into the Finnish video game Frets on Fire.
2006
 Juliette Pochin (Wales) performed on her debut album an operatic suite of sonnets set to the concerti.
 Accentus chamber choir (France) recorded a choral version of the "Winter" concerto.
 Stéphane Lambiel (Switzerland) performed his long program to a medley of the concerti to win the World Figure Skating Championships.

2007
 Celtic Woman (Ireland) recorded the "Winter" Largo with vocals (Italian lyrics). The youngest former member, Chloë Agnew, originally recorded it for her Walking in the Air album which was released in 2002.
 PercaDu (Israel) performed an arrangement of the Allegro non molto movement from the "Winter" concerto, for marimbas with chamber orchestra.
 Mauro Bigonzetti (Italy) choreographed a ballet of the concerti for a French-Canadian dance company.
 Tim Slade (Australia) directed 4, a documentary which follows four classical violinists in their homelands (of Tokyo; Thursday Island, New York; and Lapland), as they relate to Vivaldi's Four Seasons.
 Seoul Metropolitan Traditional Music Orchestra performed the concerti with arrangement for Korean traditional music (gugak) orchestra by Seong-gi Kim. It was recorded live and released with CD from Synnara Music same year.

2008
 Sveceny & Dvorak (Czech Republic) produced both an album and stage production of world music based on the concerti.
 Yves Custeau (Canada) recorded a rock & roll "one-man band" version of the "Spring" Allegro.
 Daisy Jopling (England/United States) recorded a violin & hip-hop version of the Allegro non molto movement from the "Winter" concerto, and also performs it reggae-style.
 Innesa Tymochko (Ukraine) performed her crossover version of the Presto from the "Summer" concerto, for violin.
 Wez Bolton (Isle of Man) recorded a cover version of the Allegro non molto movement from the "Winter" concerto, based on the Japanese video game "Beatmania" remix.
 Patrick Chan (Canada) performed his long program to a medley of the concerti to win the Canadian Figure Skating Championships.

2009
 Absynth Against Anguish (Romania) produced an electronic (trance) version of the concerti.
 Riccardo Arrighini (Italy) recorded the concerti for solo piano, in a jazz style.
 Christophe Monniot recorded ambient-jazz interpretations of the concerti.
 Christian Blind (France) recorded a surf guitar/acid rock version of the Allegro movement from the "Spring" concerto.
 

2010
 Art Color Ballet (Poland) performed their "4 elements" show to the Presto movement from the "Summer" concerto, arranged by Hadrian Filip Tabęcki (Kameleon).
 David Garrett (Germany) recorded a crossover version of Vivaldi's winter (allegro non molto), combining classical violin with modern rock music.

2011
 Black Smith (Russia) performed the Presto movement from the "Summer" concerto in the style of thrash metal music (likewise, this movement has been covered numerous times by aspiring electric guitar virtuosos, and other crossover musicians).
 Angels (Greece) performed their crossover version of the same movement, scored for electric strings.
 Szentpeteri Csilla (Hungary) performed her crossover version of the same movement, scored for piano.
 Leonel Valbom (Portugal) remixed the Presto movement from the "Summer" concerto with VST Synths.
 Tim Kliphuis (Netherlands) performed the Allegro from the "Spring" movement as a crossover of world-music styles.

2012
 Russian violinist Olga Kholodnaya and Argentinian drummer Marino Colina arranged and recorded live in Berlin a version for violin and drum kit.
 German-born British composer Max Richter created a postmodern and minimalist recomposition, Recomposed by Max Richter: Vivaldi – The Four Seasons. Working with solo violinist Daniel Hope, Richter discarded around 75 per cent of the original source material; the album is 44 minutes long.
 Aura (Japan) recorded an a cappella arrangement of the concerti, and had also performed Vivaldi's Spring chorus (from Dorilla in Tempe) on a prior album.
 Sinfonity (Spain) performed the concerti for "electric-guitar orchestra".
 Bachod Chirmof (USA) produced a MIDI recording & animation of Vivaldi's winter (movements I & III).
 Tornado Classic (Russia) performed the Presto movement from the "Summer" concerto, with electric guitar and slap bass.
 The symphonic rock band Trans-Siberian Orchestra used a portion of the first movement of the "Winter" concerto in their song "Dreams of Fireflies (On A Christmas Night)" on their Dreams of Fireflies EP.

2013
 Richard Galliano (France) recorded the concerti for accordion, as well as a few of his opera arias on the instrument.
 Vito Paternoster (Italy) recorded the concerti in the form of sonatas for cello.
 Periodic (Germany) produced a megamix of the concerti, which incorporates electronica with samples of a classical recording.
 Steven Buchanan (USA) produced a tetralogy of "midseasons" (slow movements and corresponding sonnets) from Vivaldi's program music.

2014
 The Piano Guys (USA) recorded an arrangement for piano and cello, a crossover between the "Winter" concerto and "Let it Go" from the computer-animated film Frozen.
 Along with the original composition of "Winter" included in Fantasia: Music Evolved, there are also two mixes: the "Alt Rock" mix, and the "Steve Porter" mix.

2015
 Nihad Hrustanbegovic (The Netherlands) recorded the concerti for solo accordion on Zefir Records.
 Zozimo Rech and Adrianne Simioni (Brazil) recorded the concerti on electric and acoustic guitar on the Astronomusic label.
 Lupe Fiasco's songs "Summer", "Fall", "Winter", & "Spring" on his album Tetsuo & Youth reference the concerti.

 Justin Bird (New Zealand) transcribed the concerti for solo piano.
 In April, violist David Aaron Carpenter recorded the concerti, arranged for viola and released with an arrangement of Piazzolla's Estaciones Porteñas and The Four Seasons of Manhattan'' by Alexey Shor.

2019
 "For Seasons" is a recomposition of Vivaldi's concertos using algorithms to portray climate change from 1725 to 2019. Arranged by Simone Candotto and performed in November 2019 by the NDR Elbphilharomie Orchestra, under the direction of Alan Gilbert.
 Portrait of a Lady on Fire used La Serenissima's Four Seasons as part of their film soundtrack.

2021
 Ballet Arizona performed original choreography by artistic director Ib Andersen in an outdoor performance set against the lush Southwest landscape of the Desert Botanical Gardens.
 "The [Uncertain] Four Seasons" is a reworking of Vivaldi's original, by both human composers and AI algorithms based on climate predictions for the year 2050. Each performance is modified to fit the climatic predictions for the location of performance. The project includes a multi-orchestra, streamed event planned for November 1, 2021, in connection with the United Nations Climate Change conference held in Glasgow, Scotland. It was inspired by the 2019 performance, "For Seasons."
 ATEEZ incorporated the "Summer" concerto into their cover of iKON's "Rhythm Ta" on Kingdom: Legendary War.

2022
 The Brazilian telenovela Quanto Mais Vida, Melhor! covered the "Summer" concerto for a special sequence where the four main characters "switch bodies". For the scene, the compositions also had different rhythms involving rock, classical music, pop, and samba, respectively.
 Vivaldi and Italian Baroque specialists, La Serenissima (UK), "Winter" from the Manchester version of The Four Seasons was sampled in a Beats by Dre advertisement.
 The eponymous heroine of Wednesday (TV series) plays Winter at the cello. (episode 3)

References

External links

 
 
 Scores, Mutopia Project

1725 compositions
Compositions in E major
Compositions in F major
Compositions in F minor
Compositions in G minor
Concertos by Antonio Vivaldi
United States National Recording Registry recordings
Vivaldi